The Yeager General Store, in Wise's Landing, Kentucky, was listed on the National Register of Historic Places in 1983.

It was built around 1911 and was the second general store built on the site.

References

National Register of Historic Places in Trimble County, Kentucky
Commercial buildings completed in 1911
1911 establishments in Kentucky
General stores in the United States
Commercial buildings on the National Register of Historic Places in Kentucky